Battle stations or general quarters is an announcement aboard a naval warship to alert the crew to prepare for battle.

Battle stations or battlestations may also refer to:

 Battlestations!, a Star Trek: The Original Series novel by Diane Carey
 Battle Stations, a 1997 video game
 Battlestations: Midway, a 2007 video game
 Battlestations: Pacific, a 2009 sequel
 Battle Stations (album), an album by Eddie "Lockjaw" Davis and Johnny Griffin
 "Battlestations", a 1986 song by Wham!, one of the b-sides of "The Edge of Heaven"
 Battle Stations a 1944 short film narrated by Ginger Rogers
 Battle Stations, a 1956 film featuring John Lund